The Medium Diesel Engine (MDE) is a four-cylinder diesel engine developed by Adam Opel AG and branded "1.6 CDTI Ecotec" in most markets. Opel also adds the marketing term "Whisper Diesel" in some markets, claiming relatively low levels of noise, vibration, and harshness. Production commenced in late 2013 at Szentgotthárd, Hungary. Maximum power and torque have been increased versus the previous-generation 1.7-liter engine, while fuel consumption has been reduced by up to 10 percent compared with a 2.0-liter CDTI engine of similar power output. This new 1.6 CDTI engine will replace the current 1.7-liter and lower-powered 2.0-liter diesel engines in a wide range of Opel models, with more- and less-powerful versions to come.

It uses an aluminum engine block, die-cast aluminum bedplate, and an aluminum cylinder head. A chain driven dual overhead camshaft, employing weight-saving hollow sections and lobes, operates four valves per cylinder with low-friction, hydraulic roller finger followers. The pistons are made from aluminum for reduced reciprocating mass, feature a concave, shallow-bowl profile to facilitate efficient combustion, and are cooled by under-skirt oil spraying. The crankshaft employs four counterweights to minimize mass, and both it and the con-rods are made of forged steel. The engine features multiple improvements to reduce NVH, such as a cam cover made of GRP and fully decoupled from the engine to reduce noise and vibration, while also saving weight compared to aluminum; a composite intake manifold encapsulated in acoustic padding as well as an external plastic shield that both significantly reduce noise emissions; a mechanical crankshaft isolator which reduces radiated noise and torsional vibrations in the accessory drive system; and scissor gears for the timing drive system, incorporating tooth profiles ground with a Low Noise Shifting (LNS) process for optimal noise reduction. More than 150 patented diesel control functions are deployed by the engine's ECU, which was developed in-house by General Motors and jointly engineered in Italy (by GM Powertrain Torino), Germany, and the United States, and will be used in all future GM four-cylinder diesel engines.

Low fuel consumption and Euro 6-standard emissions (effective from September 2015) are also made possible by the use of Opel's "BlueInjection" Selective catalytic reduction (SCR) system, which injects AdBlue, a urea-and-water solution, into the exhaust stream. The solution decomposes into ammonia, which is then stored on a catalyst substrate. When nitrogen oxide from the exhaust gases enters the catalyst, it is then selectively reduced to nitrogen and water.

From 2013, this engine replaced the 1.7 L CDTI as well as lower-powered variants of the 2.0 L CDTI Ecotec  engines in Opel cars, and also superseded the 1.3 L CDTI engines in the Corsa, Meriva and Astra. GM also introduced the MDE engine in the 2017 Chevrolet Cruze and the 2018 Chevrolet Equinox and GMC Terrain sold in the United States.

Applications and usage 
The applications of these engines are summarized below:

Timing chain malfunction 
The engine is prone to early timing chain wear and failure, early symptoms include a rattling sound during start up and during operation eventually leading to total engine failiure. This issue has never been addressed by the manufacturer and appears to affect all production years. The timing chain is located at the rear of the engine and as such replacement is significantly harder and expensive than a typical (front) timing chain.

This issue is easily averted by using 0w20 oil as now recommended by Vauxhall/Opel and the chain replacement tends to be carried out along side clutch replacement as the gearbox will already be removed from that side of the engine.

The rattle has been known to start as early as 50 000 miles, but this is similar to the issue with the 1.3 LSF engine used in previous Astras. If the oil and filter is changed regularly, the replacement window becomes significantly larger – as much as 100 000 miles. Some customers reported that the rattle sound appear briefly during startup and at the range between 1 500 and 2 500 rpm.

Vauxhall recommends 20 000 miles or 12 month oil services, it is suggested halving that to 10 000 or 6 months. The typical repair times of the timing chain are 4 to 6 hours within a workshop with a two post vehicle lift.

See also
GM Medium Gasoline Engine
GM Small Gasoline Engine
List of GM engines

References

External links
 http://gmpowertrain.com
 http://www.greencarcongress.com/2013/04/page/17/
 http://www.greencarcongress.com/2013/01/opel-20130116.html
 http://media.opel.com/content/media/intl/en/opel/news.detail.html/content/Pages/news/intl/en/2013/opel/02-13-opel-zafira-seven-seater.html
 http://media.opel.com/content/media/intl/en/opel/news.detail.html/content/Pages/news/intl/en/2013/opel/01_16_new_opel_diesel.html

General Motors engines
Opel engines
Straight-three engines
Straight-four engines
Diesel engines by model